Ramal Amanov (born 13 September 1984) is an Azerbaijani boxer competing at lightweight.

Career highlights 
In the 2005 World Amateur Boxing Championships, Amanov won silver at lightweight, losing the final 28:42 to Cuban Yordenis Ugás having beaten one of the favorites Domenico Valentino of Italy 29:22 in the semifinal.

In 2006 Amanov won a gold medal in the Anwar Chowdhry Cup, defeating Aydin Selcuk of Turkey 37:28 in the final bout.

At the 2007 World Championships he defeated Daouda Sow but lost to eventual winner Frankie Gavin.

References 

Azerbaijani male boxers
1984 births
Living people
AIBA World Boxing Championships medalists
Lightweight boxers